Hornby Castle is a grade I listed fortified manor house on the edge of Wensleydale between Bedale and Leyburn, in the county of North Yorkshire, England. 

Originally 14th century, it has been remodelled in the 15th, 18th and 20th centuries. It is constructed of coursed sandstone rubble with lead and stone slate roofs. The present building is the south range of a larger complex, the rest of which has been demolished.

History

At the end of the 14th century Hornby castle belonged to the St Quintin family, until heiress Margaret Quintin married John Conyers (died 1422).

It was largely rebuilt in the fifteenth century by William Conyers, 1st Baron Conyers, but retained the fourteenth-century St. Quintins tower (demolished in 1927) named after the previous owners. On the death in 1557 of John Conyers, 3rd Baron Conyers, the estate passed to his daughter Elizabeth, who was married to Thomas Darcy. It descended in the Darcy family (made the Earls of Holderness in 1682) to Robert Darcy, 4th Earl of Holderness, who died in 1778. Conyers Darcy, 2nd Earl of Holderness was elected MP for Boroughbridge in 1660 and for Yorkshire in 1661.

During the English Civil War the Hornby was taken by Colonel Ralph Assheton, commander-in-chief of the Parliamentary forces in North Lancashire but an order to slight the castle was not carried out. The house was largely rebuilt in the 1760s by John Carr of York, who was responsible for the surviving south range and the east range (demolished in the 1930s) and outbuildings, for the 4th Earl of Holderness. 

The 4th Earl's daughter and heir Amelia, Baroness Darcy and Baroness Conyers, married Francis Osborne, Marquess of Carmarthen, who later became the 5th Duke of Leeds. He assembled at Hornby rich early eighteenth-century furniture from several houses, illustrated in the books of Percy Macquoid. On Amelia's death in 1784 the estate passed to her son George Osborne, 6th Duke of Leeds (1775–1838). After Kiveton Hall was demolished in 1811, Hornby became the main seat of the Dukes of Leeds, until George Osborne, 9th Duke of Leeds.

In 1930 the estate was broken up and most of the house demolished. A 16th-century main doorway is preserved in the Burrell Collection, Glasgow.

The remaining property, originally the south range, was bought in 1936 by Major-General Walter E. Clutterbuck and passed down to Roger Clutterbuck and his wife Julia, who are restoring the parkland to grass and have introduced a small herd of bison. As a private residence the hall is not open to the public.

See also
Hornby Castle, Lancashire

References

Colvin, Howard A Biographical Dictionary of British Architects 1600-1840 3rd ed. (Yale University Press) 1995: "John Carr"

Castles in North Yorkshire
Grade I listed buildings in North Yorkshire
Country houses in North Yorkshire
Gardens by Capability Brown